Ampuan Mohammad Nurul Azami bin Ampuan Hussin (born 31 July 1985) is a Bruneian footballer who plays as a defender for Ar Rawda FC. He played professionally for Brunei DPMM FC in the Singaporean S.League, having started his career with the royalty-owned club since the days of playing in the Brunei Premier League.

Career

Nurul Azami began his playing career with DPMM FC, starting out as a striker. Unable to break into the team even though he changed position to a defender, he found himself playing for Majra FC in the 2007-08 Brunei Premier League. He stayed there for 3 seasons, then was reinvited to train with DPMM who were preparing for the 2012 S.League after a two-year exile.

Nurul Azami initially failed his mandatory S.League fitness test but managed to pass it in time for the match against Tampines Rovers on 12 February in which he was an unused substitute. He made his S.League bow five days later against SAF FC, replacing Rodrigo Gral in the closing stages after Shahrazen Said netted a late game-winning goal for a 1–2 score.

Nurul Azami was finally given a chance to play from the start on 24 October against Hougang United after regular right-back Subhi Bakir was caught with a disciplinary suspension. He duly scored the third goal of the game in a 1–3 win to put the S.League title within touching distance for DPMM. Unfortunately, he suffered an injury on his next game against Balestier Khalsa, DPMM conceded two goals after his substitution to lose 0–2 at the Hassanal Bolkiah National Stadium to hand Tampines Rovers the league title. The injury ultimately curtailed his development, as he would manage only two substitute appearances for the next two seasons. He had to repeat his Cooper test in 2014 and was released at the conclusion of that season.

Nurul Azami made several appearances for Kota Ranger FC in the 2015 Brunei Premier League and scored a goal against BSRC FT in a 3-2 victory. The Rangers finished the season unbeaten at the top of the league and won promotion to the 2016 Brunei Super League. He returned to the team for the 2017-18 season and once again scored in a league fixture against Jerudong FC.

Honours 
Brunei DPMM FC
Singapore League Cup: 2012
Kota Ranger
Brunei Premier League: 2015

References

External links

1985 births
Living people
Association football defenders
Bruneian footballers
DPMM FC players